Batuque, the Soul of a People (French title:Batuque, l'âme d'un peuple) is a 2006 documentary film written and directed by Júlio Silvão Tavares about the batuque musical group Raiz di Tambarina, and roots of this musical genre in Santiago, Cape Verde.

Synopsis
African slaves were first brought to Cape Verde by Portuguese settlers in 1462. These slaves brought with them the cultural rhythm and music which would become Batuque: a musical form punctuated by drums while participants danced in a circle. The dance, repressed during the Colonial era, has been adopted as a symbol of the Cape Verdan cultural identity. The film seeks to document the dance form through interviews and performance by the musical group Raiz di Tambarina.

Cast

Production
Batuque, the Soul of a People was Silvão's first film. He participated in a course with the Africadoc network before beginning production. The film was initially pitched by Silvão in Senegal, filmed in Cape Verde and edited in France.

Reception

Release
The film was screened in Lisbon in November 2010, with the filmmaker in attendance, before traveling to festivals in Brazil and the United States. It had previously screened at Africa in the Picture, Netherlands, the Copenhagen International Documentary Festival, Denmark, the
24th International Documentary Film Festival Amsterdam, Netherlands, the Africa in Motion film festival, Edinburgh, Scotland, and the AfryKamera Film Festival, Poland.

References

External links
 Batuque, l'âme d'un peuple at the Internet Movie Database
 Júlio Silvão Tavares at the Internet Movie Database

Cape Verdean documentary films
Documentary films about women in music
2006 documentary films
2006 films
Cape Verdean music
Films set in Cape Verde
2006 directorial debut films

fr:Batuque – A alma de um povo